Tyinholmen is an area on the north of the mountain lake Tyin in Jotunheimen in Vang, Oppland, Norway. At the place is a resort that has been in operation since 1892.

Vang, Oppland